XHQK-FM is a radio station on 98.5 FM in San Luis Potosí, San Luis Potosí. It is owned by Grupo ACIR and carries its Mix English adult contemporary format.

History
XHQK received its concession on October 7, 1977. It was owned by ACIR founder Francisco Ibarra López.

On February 26, 2020, the Mix and La Comadre formats swapped frequencies in San Luis, with La Comadre going to XHTL-FM 99.3.

References

Radio stations in San Luis Potosí
Grupo ACIR